Petar Čestić (born 1 February 1974) is a Serbian former footballer.

Born in Belgrade, Serbian and Yugoslav capital, during his career he played with Serbian clubs FK Partizan, FK Zemun, FK Big Bull Bačinci and FK Rad, Belgian Royal Antwerp FC, Chinese Beijing Guoan F.C., Israeli Bnei Yehuda Tel Aviv F.C. and Aussy Adelaide City Force.

External links
 Profile at Srbijafudbal
 
 Profile - FC Antwerp

Living people
1974 births
Footballers from Belgrade
Serbian footballers
FK Partizan players
Royal Antwerp F.C. players
Expatriate footballers in Belgium
FK Zemun players
Beijing Guoan F.C. players
Expatriate footballers in China
Bnei Yehuda Tel Aviv F.C. players
Serbian expatriate sportspeople in China
Expatriate footballers in Israel
Adelaide City FC players
Serbian expatriate sportspeople in Israel
Expatriate soccer players in Australia
FK Rad players
Serbian expatriate sportspeople in Australia
Association football defenders
Serbian expatriate sportspeople in Belgium